The Millennium Bridge is a pedestrian bridge over the River Clyde in the city of Glasgow, Scotland, built as part of the millennium celebrations and funded by the Millennium Commission. The Bridge links the Scottish Exhibition and Conference Centre with the Glasgow Science Centre and Pacific Quay development to the south.

The bridge was opened to the public in 2002.

The bridge is currently closed to marine traffic (2023)

References

Bridges in Glasgow
Pedestrian bridges in Scotland
Bridges across the River Clyde
Buildings and structures celebrating the third millennium
Govan
Bridges completed in 2002
2002 establishments in Scotland